The Loch Line of Glasgow, Scotland, was a group of colonial clippers managed by Messrs William Aitken and James Lilburn. They plied between the United Kingdom and Australia from 1867 to 1911.

History
In the late 1860s, Messrs Aitken and Lilburn formed the Glasgow Shipping Company with six 1,200-ton iron sailing clippers. In 1873 a second company, the General Shipping Company, was formed with a different group of investors, but also managed by Aitken and Lilburn. Originally, the Glasgow Shipping Company was intended to serve Adelaide and Melbourne and the General Shipping Company to serve Sydney, but over time the two companies merged and were only distinguished for shareholding purposes. The merged companies rapidly grew and became commonly and officially known as the Loch Line. The Loch Line fleet grew to 25 ships.

At first, it had been intended to name the ships after clans, but the Clan Line registered the name first. As a consequence, the decision was made to name the fleet after Lochs in Scotland. A keen yachtsman, and one-time Commodore of the Royal Northern Yacht Club, James Lilburn was a man who thoroughly understood ships, but loved them for their own sake. It was under such owners that sailors considered themselves lucky to serve.

The usual route was to load general cargo and passengers at Glasgow and then sail to Adelaide. They then sailed on to Melbourne or Sydney where they loaded wool or grain, generally for London. The company never changed to steamships but persisted with sail, and from 1900 consistently ran at a financial loss. Passengers generally preferred the speed and comfort of steamers and also as a consequence, freight rates dropped. The ships usually managed one round voyage to Australia per year, and half of this time was unprofitably spent in port, loading, unloading or waiting for cargos. Experimental homeward voyages via San Francisco, South Africa and New Caledonia also proved unprofitable, and the service finally closed in 1911. The remaining six ships were sold.

Reputation
The Loch Line had a reputation of misfortune, as it lost several vessels. Seventeen vessels bearing the Loch name sank in accidents, disappeared, were wrecked or torpedoed in oceans and ports around the globe. Of the 25 ships in the Loch Line fleet, only five remained and were sold off when the company finally closed in 1911.

Fleet

See also
Australian National Maritime Museum
Scottish Maritime Museum

References

External links

Aitken, Lilburn & Company
Loch Line Ltd
Glasgow Shipping Company Ltd
General Shipping Company Ltd 
Loch Line Company Flag

Victorian-era merchant ships of the United Kingdom
Shipping companies of Scotland
Companies based in Glasgow
Scotland-related lists